The New Politics Alliance for Democracy held a leadership election on 8 February 2015. It was an election held in about six months since Kim Han-gil and Ahn Cheol-soo, who were NPAD's co-leaders, resigned on 31 July 2014.

Candidates

Dropped out 
 Cho Kyoung-tae, member of the National Assembly(Saha B).
 Park Joo-sun, member of the National Assembly(Dong–Nam B).

Advance to the finals 
 Moon Jae-in, member of the National Assembly(Sasang), former Chief Presidential Secretary of President Roh Moo-hyun.
 Lee In-young, member of the National Assembly(Guro A).
 Park Jie-won, member of the National Assembly(Mokpo), former Floor leader of the party, former Chief Presidential Secretary of President Kim Dae-jung, former Minister of Culture and Tourism.

Results 
The ratio of the results by sector was 45% for delegates, 30% for party members, 15% for opinion poll and 10% for non-voting members poll.

References 

Minjoo Party of Korea
New Politics Alliance
New Politics Alliance
Political party leadership elections in South Korea
New Politics Alliance for Democracy leadership election